The 2017  World Wrestling Championships were the 14th edition of World Wrestling Championships of combined events and was held from August 21 to 27 in Paris, France.

Medal table

Team ranking

Medal summary

Men's freestyle

Men's Greco-Roman

Women's freestyle

Participating nations
684 competitors from 73 nations participated.

 (1)
 (3)
 (2)
 (12)
 (6)
 (6)
 (22)
 (1)
 (22)
 (7)
 (19)
 (16)
 (2)
 (22)
 (3)
 (9)
 (1)
 (4)
 (10)
 (7)
 (3)
 (8)
 (8)
 (5)
 (5)
 (23)
 (16) 
 (20)
 (7)
 (1)
 (2)
 (16)
 (24)
 (16)
 (5)
 (5)
 (24)
 (23)
 (19)
 (3)
 (9)
 (3)
 (13)
 (16)
 (5)
 (1)
 (1)
 (3)
 (6)
 (6)
 (5)
 (2)
 (1)
 (8)
 (18)
 (3)
 (1)
 (10)
 (24)
 (5)
 (5)
 (1)
 (24)
 (5)
 (9)
 (2)
 (1)
 (2)
 (23)
 (24)
 (24)
 (11)
 (5)

References

External links 
 Results Book

 
World Wrestling Championships
World Wrestling Championships
World Wrestling Championships
World Wrestling Championships
World Championships
World Wrestling Championships
August 2017 sports events in Europe